The Ontario Young Progressive Conservative Association or Ontario Young PCs (OYPC) is the youth wing of the Progressive Conservative Party of Ontario.  The organization consists of Ontario Progressive Conservative Party activists between the ages of 14 and 30.

Structure

The Ontario Young Progressive Conservative Association is governed by the OYPC Executive (elected at the Annual General Meeting), consisting of the President, Vice Presidents(s), Secretary, Treasurer, as well as Directors. The President of the OYPC concurrently serves on the executive of the Ontario PC Party.

In 2019, the Ontario PC Youth Association (founded in 1954) merged with the Ontario PC Campus Association, which was the body responsible for conservative student clubs at Ontario universities, forming the Ontario Young PCs.

The OYPC is responsible for the administration of Ontario PC campus clubs at post-secondary institutions and Ontario PC Youth Riding Committees (YRC) in each of Ontario's electoral districts.

Executive

Following the Annual General Meeting on October 22, 2022, the following individuals are serving on the OYPC Executive.

President: Mattias Vanderley
Vice President, Ridings: Alessia Iafano
Vice President, Campus: Jordan Angus
Secretary: Bruce Yu 
Treasurer: Liam Corelli 
Director of Membership and Northern Outreach: Joshua Grasley
Director of Alumni and Caucus Relations: Michael Mandel
Director of Training: Luca Battista
Director of Policy: Julian Nino Ciaccia
Director of Communications: Brooke Richards
Past President: Alexander Corelli

Alumni

A number of former members and executives of the Ontario PC young wing have gone on to hold elected office. A selection of prominent former members is listed below. 

The Honourable John Baird, PC
The Honourable Tony Clement, PC
The Honourable Peter Van Loan, PC
The Honourable Dr. K. Kellie Leitch, PC OOnt FRCSC 
Rod Phillips, former MPP and former Ontario cabinet minister
Lisa MacLeod, MPP and former Ontario cabinet minister
The Honourable Stephen Lecce, MPP and Minister of Education
His Worship John Tory, OOnt
His Worship Patrick Brown
Stella Ambler, former MP
Andrea Khanjin, MPP
Eric Melillo, MP

Past Presidents

2019 - Alex Corelli

2018 - Carl Qiu 

2016 - Kinsey Schurm

2015 - Zack Goldford

2013 - Alanna Newman

2012 - Shawn Roberts 

2011 - Valerie Huang

2010 - Jefferson Huang 

2009 - Antonette Williams 

2008 - Francis Aguilar 

2007 - Michael Wilson

2006 - Patrick Pilch 

2005 - Leslie Morrison

2004 - Christopher Tran 

2003 - Patrick Harris

2002 - Ms. Wilson

2001 - Dave Forestell

References

Youth wings of political parties in Canada.